Zazzle is an American online marketplace that allows designers and customers to create their own products with independent manufacturers (clothing, posters, etc.), as well as use images from participating companies. Zazzle has partnered with many brands to amass a collection of digital images from companies like Disney, Warner Brothers and NCAA sports teams. Zazzle claims to have over 300 million unique products listed on the site.

Zazzle was launched from their garage by Robert, Bobby, and Jeffrey Beaver, and went live in 2005. The company received an initial investment of US$16 million in July 2005 from Google investors John Doerr and Ram Shriram, and an additional investment of US$30 million in October 2007.

The site was recognized by TechCrunch as 2007's "best business model" in its first annual Crunchies awards, and has been noted by industry experts, such as B. Joseph Pine, for its easy-to-use technology. It is based in Redwood City, California.

Zazzle.com offers digital printing, and embroidered decoration on their retail apparel items, as well as other personalization techniques and items.

Font lawsuit
In August of 2022, graphic designer Nicky Laatz sued Zazzle, saying that the company had secretly purchased a one-user license for her trademarked and copyright-protected fonts and then made them available to all of its hundreds of thousands of designers and tens of millions of users, resulting in hundreds of millions of dollars of profits for Zazzle from products that incorporated her fonts. The lawsuit claims that Zazzle had recommended her font as their second most popular font, and that five of Zazzle's twelve most-popular business cards, as well as several of its most-popular wedding invitations used her fonts.

References

External links

 

2005 establishments in California
American companies established in 2005
Companies based in Redwood City, California
Companies established in 2005
Companies formerly listed on the Nasdaq
Online marketplaces of the United States
Internet properties established in 2005
Retail companies established in 2005
Self-publishing online stores